Summercase was a two-day music festival held simultaneously in Barcelona and Madrid. The schedules were the same but reverted. The line up mainly consists of indie rock, electronic music and indie pop. Hence, the festival tries to blend indie pop, rock music and dance music into one. The first edition of the festival was organized in July 2006, with a total public of over 60,000, and the second edition was celebrated on 13 & 14 July 2007, attracting over 109,000. In only one year, the festival has become one of the most important ones of Europe and falls into the category of world-famous music festivals such as the Denmark's Roskilde Festival, the Dutch Pinkpop, Ireland's Oxegen, the Spanish International Music Festival of Benicàssim or the major festivals in the UK: T in the Park, Reading Festival, Leeds Festival, the V Festival and Glastonbury Festival and may be compared to California's Coachella Festival or Chicago's Lollapalooza.

2006 Line-up

2007 Line-up

2008 Line-up

Incidents 
On Saturday July 19, 2008, following an incident at Summercase in Barcelona, Bloc Party frontman Kele Okereke claimed that he was verbally insulted by Sex Pistols frontman John Lydon and physically attacked by his "entourage". Okereke said that he was "set upon" by three members of Lydon's crew after praising Lydon's musical past and inquiring on the future of Lydon's group Public Image Ltd. One of Lydon's friends then told Okereke: "Your problem is your black attitude", and Lydon and members of his security detail attacked Ricky Wilson of Kaiser Chiefs and Yannis Philippakis of Foals when they attempted to aid Okereke. Philippakis informed the crowd at Latitude Festival the next day that the incident was so bad that he had been handcuffed and nearly didn't make it. Whilst the incident was witnessed by more than 50 people, including members of Mystery Jets, Kaiser Chiefs, Foals, Mogwai and The Raveonettes, Okereke's version of the events are disputed by Lydon. However Neon Neon and Super Furry Animals frontman Gruff Rhys, who also witnessed the incident, backed Okereke, describing it as "horrific". Rhys stated Kele was "a very brave man" and told MTV News that "the statements Kele has said are absolutely true. What he said is exactly what happened."

End of the festival 
In 2009, the festival wasn't reconducted for economic reasons.

References 

Music festivals in Spain
Recurring events established in 2006
Electronic music festivals in Spain